A grook is a form of short aphoristic poem or rhyming aphorism, created by the Danish poet, designer, inventor and scientist Piet Hein, who wrote over 10,000 of them, mostly in Danish. They have been published in Danish in 20 volumes. Each grook has a unique line drawing accompanying the words of the poem and providing additional meaning.

Some say that the name "gruk" is short for "grin & suk", but Piet Hein said he felt that the word had come out of thin air. The contemporary "Hunden Grog" ("Grog the Dog") stories by fellow cartoonist Storm P. has, in public opinion, been regarded as an inspiration.

Piet Hein's gruks first started to appear in the daily newspaper "Politiken" shortly after the Nazi Occupation in April 1940 under the signature Kumbel Kumbell.  The poems were meant as a spirit-building, yet slightly coded form of passive resistance. The grooks are multi-faceted and characterized by irony, paradox, brevity, precise use of language,  rhythm and rhyme, and an often satiric nature.

Beginning in the 1960s seven volumes of English translations of 53 grooks each were published and became popular in the U.S. counterculture of the time: Grooks (The MIT Press, 1966), Grooks 2 (Doubleday, 1968), Grooks 3 (Doubleday, 1970), Grooks 4 (Doubleday, 1973), Grooks 5 (Doubleday, 1973), Grooks VI (Borgen's, 1978), and Grooks VII (Borgen's, 1984).

Extracts

The Road to Wisdom

The Eternal Twins

Problems

To Sum Up

References

External links

Grooks – Leptonica
Grooks
Grooks in English by Piet Hein
Poetry Soup- Grook poems

Genres of poetry
Danish culture